Sammitr Group (SMM) (stylized in all caps) is a Thai manufacturing company. It is a manufacturer of leaf springs, passenger vehicles, truck body parts, molds, jigs and fixtures for auto makers. Additionally, it is also the manufacturer for dump trucks, trailers, semi-trailers, specially designed trucks, steel canopies, and accessories for pick-up trucks later on.

The company was founded in 1959. Its headquarters is located in Om Noi, Thailand. The company also have overseas manufacturing facilities in Changchun and Nanjing, China. Sammitr Group is a privately held, family-owned company, with the majority of shares held by the current CEO, Chao Posirisuk.

References 

Manufacturing companies of Thailand